Memorial Plaza may refer to: 
National September 11 Memorial & Museum, World Trade Center, New York City, commonly referred to as Memorial Plaza
Memorial Plaza (St. Louis, Missouri)